Manuel Dominguez (1803–1882) was a Californian rancher.

Manuel Domínguez may also refer to:

 Manuel Domínguez (1868–1935), Vice President of Paraguay from 1902 to 1904
 Manuel Domínguez (early 20th century), Paraguayan writer and member of Viriato Díaz Pérez's 1907 literary circle La Colmena
 Manuel Jorge Domínguez (born 1962), Spanish cyclist
 Manuel Domínguez González (born 1974), Spanish politician